Addalaichenai in the Ampara District of Sri Lanka derived its name from a classical origin "Addala Chenai" in which Addala (அடளை) means a place made for protect the cultivation at higher places, and Chena (சேனை) means crop cultivation. However many is of the opinion that farmers origin is also behind the framing of the name Addalaichenai. The village Addalaichenai was being part of Akkaripattu up to 1978 and then separated from Akkaraipattu. Addalaichenai came to be regarded as the country's agricultural important place in 1978 when the DRO office was formed. Addalaichenai has been well known by traders from almost 2000 years ago.

Prior to the establishment of the Divisional Secretariat in 1991, the office of the Assistant Government Agent was functioning as the institution catering to the day to day news of the people in the division.

which was in view on office of the Assistant Government Agent was opened on October 10, 1973 in Addalaichenai consisting Palamunai, Oluvil, Deegawapiya and Thiraikerny hamlets. This office is situated on the main road near the 36th mile post from Batticaloa to Akkaraipattu in the coastal belt of Ampara District.

On the north there is the Kaliodai river, on the south Akkaraipattu D.S. Office Boundary and drainage road. On the east Bay of Bengal, on the west a vast stretch of Paddy Lands and the eastern boundaries of Sammanthurai, Irakkaman and Damana Divisional Secretariat.

History of Addalaichenai Divisional Secretariat 
Prior to October 10, 1973, the Addalaichenai Division was alliterate with the Akkaraipattu Division. After this date a separate division was carved out from Akkaraipattu and named as Addalaichenai Division. At that time there was a voluntary organization namely "Social Service Society" which was instruments in greeting this new with the able assistance of the late M.M. Musthapha, Member of Parliament and Deputy Minister of Finance.

Late Mr. Senerath Somarathne, M.P. and political authorities of the Ampara District was good enough to allocate sufficient funds from DCB to construct the present building complex.

Role performed at DS

References 

Towns in Ampara District
Addalaichenai DS Division